Ivanayevo (İvanay) is a rural locality (a selo) and the administrative centre of Takarlikovsky Selsoviet, Dyurtyulinsky District, Bashkortostan, Russia. The population was 1,584 as of 2010. There are 27 streets.

Geography 
Ivanayevo is located 3 km northwest of Dyurtyuli (the district's administrative centre) by road. Dyurtyuli is the nearest rural locality.

References 

Rural localities in Dyurtyulinsky District